Elections for the Scottish district councils were held on Tuesday 7 May 1974, for both the new regional and district councils, between the two United Kingdom general elections of February and October in that same year.

These were the first elections held to the 53 district councils established by the Local Government (Scotland) Act 1973.  The Labour Party did reasonably well and the Scottish National Party (SNP) did not.  The councillors acted as "shadow" councils until May 1975, when the provisions of the Local Government (Scotland) Act 1973 came into effect.

Results

National results

|-
!colspan=2|Parties
!Votes
!Votes %
!Wards
|-
| 
|658,089
|38.5
|172
|-
| 
|488,905
|28.6
|112
|-
| 
|215,502
|12.6
|18
|-
| 
|87,333
|5.1
|11
|-
| style="width: 10px" bgcolor=|
| style="text-align: left;" scope="row" | Independent/Other
|261,372
|15.3
|114/5
|-
!colspan=2|Total!! !! !!
|}

|-
!colspan=2|Parties
!Votes
!Votes %
!Wards
|-
| 
|619,531
|38.4
|428
|-
| 
|433,287
|26.8
|241
|-
| 
|200,307
|12.4
|62
|-
| 
|80,232
|5.0
|17
|-
| style="width: 10px" bgcolor=|
| style="text-align: left;" scope="row" | Independent/Other
|280,946
|17.5
|345/17
|-
!colspan=2|Total!! !! !!
|}

Note: Orkney, Shetland, and the Western Isles were governed at the district level as unitary authorities, meaning they were not included in any larger region.

Council Results

Regional Councils

District Councils

The seats on each council after the election were as follows:

Borders

Central

Dumfries and Galloway

Fife

Grampian

Highland

Lothian

Strathclyde

Tayside

See also
 Local government areas of Scotland 1973 to 1996
 Local Government Boundary Commission for Scotland

References

 
1974
May 1974 events in the United Kingdom